Country Girl is a 1978 album by Miriam Makeba. The album was recorded in Kumasi, Ghana, but completed in New York City with members of Ipi Tombi.

Track listing
Witch Doctor (Isangoma)	
Country Girl	
Tailor Man	
"Xica Da Silva", Jorge Ben
Meet Me At The River	
The Lion Cries (Mbube)	
Goodbye Poverty	
Click Song

References

1978 albums
Miriam Makeba albums